Nora's Woods is an undeveloped city park and native plant garden in the Madrona neighborhood of Seattle, Washington. The  house lot-sized wooded area is named for Seattleite Nora Woods, who purchased the land in 1987 that was given to The Trust for Public Land after her death in 1989. Cleanup of the overgrown and neglected property by neighborhood volunteers to create the park began in 1996 or 1997. In 1998, it became a city park.

The Columbia Street pollinator pathway connects Nora's Woods to the 18th Avenue P-Patch and the Seattle University campus.

Nora Woods' ashes are buried in Nora's Woods Park.

References

External links
Nora's Woods at Seattle Parks Dept.

Parks in Seattle